Volodymyr Borysovych Tsemakh (nicknamed "Borysych"; born July 4, 1961, Snizhne) is a pro-Russian militant of the Donetsk People's Republic, a Ukrainian collaborator with Russia, and a former Soviet soldier. In 2014 he was the Commander of the Air Defense Company in Snizhne, took part in hostilities in the area where the Boeing 777 flight MH17 was shot down.

In June 2019, during a special operation, the Security Service of Ukraine detained Tsemakh in Snizhne and took him out of the occupied territory. He was under investigation in Kyiv, but on September 5 the court released Tsemakh from custody. On September 7 he was transferred to Russia as a part of an exchange of prisoners.

Biography 
He was born on July 4, 1961 in the town of Snizhne. He graduated from Poltava Higher Anti-Aircraft Missile Command School.

He served in the Armed Forces of the USSR, participated in hostilities during the Soviet military intervention in Afghanistan, where he was the operator or commander of the self-propelled anti-aircraft gun ZSU-23-4.

The war in eastern Ukraine 
Since the spring of 2014, he has taken an active part in the fighting in eastern Ukraine on the side of the pro-Russian forces of the Donetsk People's Republic, an organization that Ukraine recognizes as terrorist. The first combat position, according to the then Minister of Defense "DNR" Igor Girkin ("Shooter"), — the commander of the calculation of mobile installations ZU-23-2 near the village of Semenovka during the battles for Slovyansk.

He was the commander of a separate air defense company in the city of Snizhne since its formation on June 7, 2014. According to the investigation, on July 17, 2014, a Boeing 777 of flight MH17 was shot down from the Snizhne district (Pervomaiskyi town).

In a Russian propaganda video, Tsemakh personally conducted a film crew at the crash site of a Malaysian Boeing and told about the downing of the Su-25 (which took place on July 16). From his account, Bellingcat concluded that Tsemakh had information about the movement and was directly involved in hiding after the Buk missile crash, from which the Boeing was shot down.

According to Ukrainian journalist , during July-August 2014, Tsemakh's company, together with the Russian Armed Forces, attacked planes and helicopters of the Armed Forces of Ukraine. According to Butusov, as company commander Tsemakh knew the field commanders of the militants near the town of Snizhne and had information about the role of Girkin ("Shooter") and the Russian military in the Fights on the Ukrainian–Russian border.

According to Girkin, during July-August 2014, Tsemakh's company was armed with several ZU-23-2 and NSV-12.7 Utyos anti-aircraft guns, but did not have weapons capable of shooting down Boeing.

According to TheBabel, Tsemakh organized the supply of military equipment, heavy weapons, small arms and ammunition from Russia to the Donetsk region and their distribution among the militants of the Donetsk People's Republic in Snizhne .

In March 2015, Tsemakh was released and sent to the DNR military commissariat in Donetsk. In March 2017, he was appointed Deputy Battalion Commander of Military Unit 08819, but was later released early.

Detention and arrest 
On June 27, 2019, as part of a special SBU operation, Tsemakh was detained in a state of intoxication in his own apartment in the temporarily occupied Snizhne and taken to the territory controlled by Ukraine via Marinka. According to the publication "Petro and Mazepa", the operation was prepared by the SBU Counterintelligence for 2 years: the detention and removal were also carried out by agents — previously recruited in Russia, citizens of Ukraine. Various sources later said that Ukraine's military intelligence was also involved in the operation to detain Tsemakh. They hit anti-personnel mines.

On June 28, Tsemakh was taken to Kyiv, and the next day the Kyiv Shevchenkivskyi District Court arrested him for two months. He was charged under Article 258-3 Part 1 of the Criminal Code of Ukraine ("Creation of a terrorist group or terrorist organization", from 8 to 15 years in prison).

The Dutch prosecutor's office has shown considerable interest in the Tsemakh case, considering Tsemakh a valuable witness in the investigation into the downing of the Malaysian Boeing. It is believed that Tsemakh's testimony in court in the Netherlands may increase the legitimacy of the investigation, as in September 2019 he was the only available witness directly involved in the fighting on the ground and during the downing of the plane, could have information about specific events and the chain of command.

According to Tsemach, investigators from Austria and the Netherlands offered him Dutch citizenship and participation in a witness protection program in exchange for testimony.

On September 5, Tsemakh was released from custody, although two days earlier, on September 3, the court continued Tsemakh's arrest. The dismissal was at the request of a lawyer. Tsemakh was given certain personal obligations — in particular, to appear on summons, but did not wear an electronic bracelet. Prosecutors demanded that Tsemakh be kept in custody, saying he could escape. Prosecutor Oleg Peresada said that now Tsemakh would be "quite difficult to access for an international joint investigation team."

Transfer to Russia and further destiny 
Since the beginning of talks with President Zelensky on the exchange of prisoners, Russian President Putin has insisted on the transfer of Tsemakh. Prior to the extradition, investigations were carried out with Tsemakh, in particular with the participation of the Dutch side, as insisted by European leaders in negotiations with Zelensky.

On September 7, 2019, he was transferred to Russia as part of an exchange of prisoners in the format of 35-to-35.

On September 10, 2019, Tsemakh returned to ORDLO, his daughter Maria Levchenko-Tsemakh reported.

Mykola Polozov, a lawyer for the released Ukrainian sailors, said that Russia could extradite Tsemakh to the Netherlands as part of their investigation into the downing of Malaysia Airlines' Boeing, as he is not a Russian citizen.

On September 11, Katie Peary, a member of the European Parliament from the Netherlands, said that the Netherlands had retrained  Tsemakh, who was previously considered a key witness in the case of the destruction of the Malaysian MH17 aircraft, on suspicion. Subsequently, the Dutch government appealed to the Russian prosecutor's office to assist in the search for Tsemakh so that the Dutch could interrogate him.

On November 7, Tsemakh's lawyer said that Volodymyr was ready to testify in the case of the downing of the plane by Dutch investigators, demanding it to take place in Russian-occupied and pro-Russian militants in Donetsk.

On December 3, the SBU declared Tsemakh wanted. It is stated that the date of disappearance is considered to be September 23, and the precautionary measure was not chosen for him. At the request of the Netherlands to extradite Tsemakh, Russian Foreign Ministry spokeswoman Maria Zakharova said that "there is no convincing evidence base." According to her, the Dutch prosecutor's office did not declare Tsemakh wanted and that he was not registered in Interpol database for search.

References 

People of the Donetsk People's Republic
1961 births
Living people
Ukrainian collaborators with Russia
Malaysia Airlines Flight 17